The 1963 Chattanooga Moccasins football team was an American football team that represented the University of Chattanooga (now known as the University of Tennessee at Chattanooga) during the 1963 NCAA College Division football season. In their 33rd year under head coach Scrappy Moore, the team compiled a 4–6 record.

Schedule

References

Chattanooga
Chattanooga Mocs football seasons
Chattanooga Moccasins football